is a railway station in the city of Nikkō, Tochigi, Japan, operated by the Yagan Railway.

Lines
Kamimiyori-Shiobara-Onsenguchi Station is served by the Yagan Railway Aizu Kinugawa Line and is located 21.0 rail kilometers from the opposing terminal at Shin-Fujiwara Station.

Station layout
The station has a single island platform.

Buses

Adjacent stations

History
It was renamed to its present name in March 2006.

Surrounding area

References

External links

 Yagen Railway Station information 

Railway stations in Tochigi Prefecture
Railway stations in Japan opened in 1986
Nikkō, Tochigi